The Surprise Fightin' Falcons are an inactive professional baseball team based in Surprise, Arizona.  They played in the Arizona Division of the independent Golden Baseball League, which is not affiliated with either Major League Baseball or Minor League Baseball.  They played their homes games at the Surprise Recreation Campus athletic facility, which includes a spring training ballpark called Surprise Stadium.

History 
The Fightin' Falcons started as one of eight charter teams in the GBL along with the Chico Outlaws, Fullerton Flyers, Long Beach Armada and San Diego Surf Dawgs in California, the Mesa Miners and Yuma Scorpions in Arizona and a traveling team, the Japan Samurai Bears that began play in May 2005.  The league owns the naming rights to the team as well as the other seven original teams.  In their only season, they finished 3rd in the Arizona Division with a 46-44 record. The team included the league's first ever MVP, Desi Wilson, who during the year had a league record 30-game hitting streak. Outfielder Billy Brown hit a team high 14 home runs and won a gold glove. The team was managed by Ozzie Virgil, Jr. and their mascot was Luke the Falcon.

The team, which played for one season, was based in the Arizona Division. Following the league suspending operations and relocation of the Miners in November 2005, the Fightin' Falcons were also dropped from the league partially to achieve a balance of six clubs instead of seven also because of no other teams being based in central Arizona, and the fact that game attendance averaged about 60 spectators per game, and extreme lack of team support.

Rebirth 
The GBL has stated publicly that they would reconsider the Arizona market (Surprise and Mesa) if the league, the city of Mesa and the concessionaire at HoHoKam Park in Mesa could reach agreement on a revenue sharing agreement for concessions sales at Miners games. The Miners were the only team in the league not to receive any funds from concessions sales at their games.

Should the Fightin' Falcons return to the league (which owns the rights to the team), they could be brought back as either an expansion or relocated team and there could be a push to have the team play at Surprise Stadium, the spring training home of the Kansas City Royals and Texas Rangers and home of the Arizona Fall League's Surprise Rafters.  That stadium is on the grounds of the Recreation Campus.  But nothing is definitive.  If not, the team name could be placed with an expansion team elsewhere.

The team cap logo and colors were being used by the Sonora Pilots of the Arizona Winter League, the GBL's instructional league.  That team has since been replaced by Team Canada.     The GBL owns the rights to the name, logos, uniforms and history of the Falcons.

Team Record

See also
 Sonora Pilots

References

External links
 Golden Baseball League

Defunct Golden Baseball League teams
Sports in Surprise, Arizona
Sports in Maricopa County, Arizona
Professional baseball teams in Arizona
2005 establishments in Arizona
2005 disestablishments in Arizona
Baseball teams established in 2005
Baseball teams disestablished in 2005
Defunct baseball teams in Arizona